Pranayanilaavu is a 1999 Indian Malayalam-language film, directed by Vinayan. The film stars Dileep, Mohini, Nedumudi Venu and K. R. Vijaya. The film's score was composed by Berny-Ignatius.

Cast
 
Dileep as Kannan 
Mohini as Nabeesu 
Nedumudi Venu as Madhavan Nair 
K. R. Vijaya as Lakshmi 
Captain Raju as Hajiyar 
Jagathy Sreekumar as Kunjahammad 
Kalabhavan Mani as Moosootty 
Meghanathan as Jamal 
Harishree Ashokan as Mathai 
Madhu as Thangal 
Neeraja Rajsankar Baiju as Kunjipathu
Manka Mahesh 
Subair 
Idavela Babu 
Indulekha
Mahima

Soundtrack
The music was composed by Berny Ignatious with lyrics by S. Ramesan Nair.

References

External links
 

1999 films
1990s Malayalam-language films
Films directed by Vinayan